Michael Pappert (born 15 August 1957) is a former West German basketball player. He competed in the men's tournament at the 1984 Summer Olympics.

References

External links
 

1957 births
Living people
Basketball players at the 1984 Summer Olympics
BSC Saturn Köln players
German expatriate basketball people in the United States
German men's basketball players
Olympic basketball players of West Germany
Redlands Bulldogs men's basketball players
Sportspeople from Hamburg